Marble Falls High School (MFHS) is a public high school in Marble Falls, Texas, USA, and a part of the Marble Falls Independent School District. 

The school has an aerospace and engineering program for students interested in these career paths.

References

External links
 Marble Falls High School

Public high schools in Texas
Schools in Burnet County, Texas